Brett Thomas Graves (born January 30, 1993) is an American professional baseball pitcher who is a free agent. He has previously played in Major League Baseball (MLB) for the Miami Marlins.

Amateur career
Graves attended Francis Howell High School in Weldon Spring, Missouri. He played for the school's baseball team as a pitcher and shortstop and for the Gridiron football team as their quarterback. In 2011, his senior year, the St. Louis Post-Dispatch named him their All-Metro baseball player of the year and he won the Gatorade Baseball Player of the Year for Missouri.

The St. Louis Cardinals selected Graves in the 26th round of the 2011 MLB draft. Rather than sign, he attended the University of Missouri and played college baseball for the Missouri Tigers. In his junior year, Graves led the Tigers in games started, innings pitched, and strikeouts.

Professional career

Oakland Athletics
The Oakland Athletics selected Graves in the third round of the 2014 MLB draft. He signed and spent his first professional season with both the Arizona Athletics of the Rookie-level Arizona League and the Vermont Lake Monsters of the Class A-Short Season New York-Penn League, posting a combined 3–2 win–loss record and a 6.55 earned run average (ERA) in 22 total innings. He spent the 2015 season with the Beloit Snappers of the Class A Midwest League, where he went 12–8 with a 5.36 ERA, and the 2016 season with the Stockton Ports of the Class A-Advanced California League, where he posted a 7–10 record and 4.60 ERA. In 2017, he pitched for both Stockton and the Midland RockHounds of the Class AA Texas League, going 1–1 with a 4.47 ERA in  total innings pitched. His 2017 season ended prematurely due to a strained tendon in his right ankle.

Miami Marlins
The Miami Marlins selected Graves from the Athletics' organization in the 2017 Rule 5 draft. He began the regular season on the 60 day disabled list, due to an oblique muscle strain, and made his major league debut on June 17. He was designated for assignment after the season and cleared waivers.

Oakland Athletics (second stint)
On December 10, 2020, Graves was selected by the Oakland Athletics in the minor league phase of the Rule 5 draft. He elected free agency on November 7, 2021.

See also
Rule 5 draft results

References

External links

Missouri Tigers bio

1993 births
Living people
People from St. Charles, Missouri
Baseball players from Missouri
Major League Baseball pitchers
Miami Marlins players
Missouri Tigers baseball players
Arizona League Athletics players
Vermont Lake Monsters players
Beloit Snappers players
Stockton Ports players
Midland RockHounds players
Jupiter Hammerheads players
Jacksonville Jumbo Shrimp players
New Orleans Baby Cakes players